Edith Mary Statham (13 April 1853 – 13 February 1951) was a notable New Zealand singer, nurse, secretary, war graves conservator and community worker.

Early life 
Statham was born in Bootle, Lancashire, England, on 13 April 1853.  She was a daughter of a solicitor, William Statham, and his wife, Ellen Allen Statham. When she was 10 years old, she moved to New Zealand with her family.

Education 
It is unknown how and where Statham got her education. She was trained as a singer and nurse at Dunedin Hospital.

Activities 
Statham was a founding member of the "Society for the Protection of Women and Children" in Dunedin. She was a secretary of the "Mimiro Ladies' Cycling Club", which she established around 1895, when she moved to Dunedin. Statham directed a school for many years to teach women how to cycle. She was awarded the King George V Silver Jubilee Medal in 1935.

References

1853 births
1951 deaths
19th-century New Zealand women singers
English emigrants to New Zealand
New Zealand women nurses
New Zealand nurses
People from Bootle
New Zealand community activists